George Lansing Fox (March 15, 1900 – February 3, 1943) was a Methodist minister and a lieutenant in the United States Army. He was one of the Four Chaplains who gave their lives to save other soldiers during the sinking of the troop transport  during World War II.

Life
George L. Fox was born in Lewistown, Pennsylvania, in 1900, one of five children. At 17 he ran away to join the army and served on the Western Front during World War I as a medical orderly, receiving the Silver Star, the Purple Heart, and the Croix de Guerre for his meritorious service. Following the war, Fox completed high school and briefly worked for a Trust Company. Fox married in 1923 and his son, Wyatt Ray was born a year later. Fox studied at Moody Bible Institute and Illinois Wesleyan University, graduating in 1931. Following graduation, Fox became an itinerant Methodist preacher, holding posts in Downs, Illinois, and Rye, New Hampshire, before joining the Boston University School of Theology and becoming an ordained minister in 1934.

That same year, he took over the church in Waits River, Vermont, and his daughter, Mary Elizabeth, was born. He remained in Vermont, moving church twice and becoming the state chaplain and historian for the American Legion. Fox joined the army again in 1942. His son enlisted in the Marine Corps on the same day. Fox was united with the other Four Chaplains for his voyage to Europe later that year following a position in the chaplain's school in Harvard, and departed with over 900 soldiers on the Dorchester in January 1943.

Death

In late 1942, Fox was transferred to Camp Myles Standish in Taunton, Massachusetts, and attended Chaplains School at Harvard University. There he met fellow chaplains Alexander D. Goode, Clark V. Poling and John P. Washington. In January 1943, Fox and his fellow chaplains boarded the SS Dorchester, which was carrying some 900 soldiers to the United Kingdom.

On February 2, 1943, the German submarine U-223 spotted the convoy and fired a torpedo which struck the Dorchester shortly after midnight. Hundreds of men packed the decks of the rapidly sinking ship and scrambled for the lifeboats. Several of the lifeboats had been damaged and the four chaplains began to organize the passengers. They distributed life jackets from a locker; when the supply of life jackets ran out, each of the chaplains gave theirs to other soldiers. When the last lifeboats were away, the chaplains prayed with those unable to escape the sinking ship. 27 minutes after the torpedo struck, the Dorchester sank with 672 men still aboard. The last anyone saw of the four chaplains, they were standing on the deck, arms linked and praying together.

Remembrance

The four chaplains were each awarded the Distinguished Service Cross and Purple Heart medals,  receiving national acclaim for their courage and self-sacrifice. A chapel in their honor was dedicated on February 3, 1951, by President Harry S. Truman at Grace Baptist Church of Philadelphia. The Four Chaplains' Medal was established by act of Congress on July 14, 1960, and was presented posthumously to their next of kin by Secretary of the Army Wilber M. Brucker in 1961.

George L. Fox is honored with a Lesser Feast along with the other Four Chaplains (Alexander D. Goode, John P. Washington and Clark V. Poling) on the liturgical calendar of the Episcopal Church in the United States of America on February 3.

See also

List of Notable Moody Bible Institute People

References

External links
 

1900 births
1943 deaths
People from Lewistown, Pennsylvania
Military personnel from Pennsylvania
United States Army chaplains
World War II chaplains
United States Army personnel of World War I
United States Army personnel killed in World War II
Methodist chaplains
Methodist ministers
American Methodists
Anglican saints
Boston University School of Theology alumni
Illinois Wesleyan University alumni
People who died at sea
Recipients of the Silver Star
Recipients of the Distinguished Service Cross (United States)
Recipients of the Croix de Guerre 1939–1945 (France)